Bruck may refer to any of the following:

Name

Ethiopian

Bruck is a common name for a male meaning blessed:

Places

Bruck (Bavarian for "bridge") is a common name for towns:

Austria

 Bruck am Ziller, in the district of Schwaz in Tyrol
 Bruck an der Mur in Styria
 Bruck an der Leitha in Lower Austria
 Bruck an der Großglocknerstraße in the state of Salzburg
 Bruck-Waasen, in the district of Grieskirchen
 Bruck an der Leitha (district), district in Lower Austria

Germany

 Bruck in der Oberpfalz, in the Schwandorf district of Bavaria
 Bruck, Germany, in the Ebersberg district in southern Bavaria
 Erlangen-Bruck, part of Erlangen in northern Bavaria
 Fürstenfeldbruck, in Bavaria

Other uses
 Bruck (bus + truck)
 Bruck (surname)
 Bruck–Chowla–Ryser theorem

See also
 Brugg (disambiguation)
 Brück